Hosea Townsend (June 16, 1840 – March 4, 1909) was an attorney and a U.S. Representative from Colorado. Appointed by Presidents McKinley and Roosevelt, he was a United States judge for the southern district of the Indian Territory from 1897 to 1907.

Early life and education
Born on a farm in Greenwich, Ohio, his parents were Hiram and Eliza Townsend. His father came to New London, Ohio from Massachusetts in 1816. Townsend attended the common schools and Western Reserve College, Cleveland, Ohio, in 1860.

Civil War
He was a student at the Western Reserve College at the outbreak of the American Civil War. He enlisted in the Second Regiment, Ohio Volunteer Cavalry, in 1861. He was promoted to lieutenant. He was stationed at Fort Gibson in Indian Territory during part of the war. He contracted a case of typhoid fever and resigned in 1863 due to a disability.

Career
He studied law and was admitted to the bar in Cleveland, Ohio, in 1864 or 1865. He began practicing law in Memphis, Tennessee in 1865. He served as member of the State house of representatives in 1869. He practiced law in Memphis until 1881.

He moved to Colorado in 1879 and settled in Silver Cliff in 1881. He made and lost a fortune in the mining business. Townsend was elected as a Republican to the Fifty-first and Fifty-second Congresses (March 4, 1889 – March 3, 1893). He was an unsuccessful candidate for renomination in 1892. He served as delegate to the Republican National Convention in 1892.
He was a United States judge for the southern district of the Indian Territory from 1897 to 1907. He served on the Court of Appeals. He was first appointed by President William McKinley and he was re-appointed by President Theodore Roosevelt in 1902 and 1906. Oklahoma achieved statehood in 1907 and the Indian Territory court was closed. He remained in Ardmore and practiced law.

Personal life
He married Anna Augusta Barnes on November 28, 1865 and they had two children, John Barnes Townsend and Anna Bell Townsend. After they moved to Ardmore, Oklahoma of the Indian Territory, Anna decided that the area needed a library and obtained funding  from Andrew Carnegie about 1903. The Ardmore Carnegie Library was opened on October 1, 1906. Anna and Hosea donated 800 books for the library.

He died in Ardmore, Oklahoma on March 4, 1909. He was interred in Woodlawn Cemetery, Norwalk, Ohio. Anna died in 1915.

References

External links
 

1840 births
1909 deaths
Republican Party members of the United States House of Representatives from Colorado
Republican Party members of the Tennessee House of Representatives
Indian Territory judges
19th-century American politicians
People from Memphis, Tennessee
People from Ardmore, Oklahoma
19th-century American judges